Trois-Rivières is a village on the southwest coast of Martinique, located within the commune of Sainte-Luce. It is known for its distillery/plantation Rhum Trois Rivières, located in the north of the village.

Populated places in Martinique